Heinrich Roman Riikoja (until 1924 Reichenbach; 8 March 1891 Rakke – 31 October 1988 Tartu) was an Estonian zoologist and hydrobiologist.

1910-1918 he studied at the University of Tartu, at the beginning chemistry and later natural sciences. He participated on Estonian War of  Independence. 1919-1958 he taught at Tartu University.

Since 1920 he directed the investigations of Estonian internal water bodies. He is known as the founder of Estonian hydrobiology. Among other things he compiled the list of Estonian lakes, and the list of Estonian fishes.

In 1940 he was the rector of the University of Tartu.

1922-1943 he was the representative of Estonia to International Society of Limnology.

Awards:
 1945: Estonian SSR merited scientist
 1977: Estonian SSR state prize

Works
 Zooloogia praktikum keskkoolidele (1921)
 Selgrootute loomade süstemaatiline nimestik (1923, with J. V. Veski)
 Kodumaa kalad (1927)
 Eestikeelseid zooloogilisi oskussõnu (1930, with J. V. Veski)
 Tamula ja Vagula järv (1932–33)
 Aegviidu ümbruse järvedest (1935–36)
 Eesti järvede nimestik (1934, with J. Port and others)
 Eesti NSV kalad (1950)

References

1891 births
1988 deaths
Estonian zoologists
Estonian biologists
University of Tartu alumni
Academic staff of the University of Tartu
Rectors of the University of Tartu
People from Väike-Maarja Parish